Ferdinand William Cavendish-Bentinck, 8th Duke of Portland  (4 July 1889 – 13 December 1980) was a British peer and grandson of George Cavendish-Bentinck.

The son of Frederick W. Cavendish-Bentinck and Ruth Cavendish-Bentinck, grandson of George Cavendish-Bentinck, and great-grandson of Major General Lord Frederick Cavendish-Bentinck, fourth son of the 3rd Duke of Portland, the young Cavendish-Bentinck was educated at Eton and the Royal Military College, Sandhurst, passing out in 1910. He was commissioned into the 60th Rifles and was posted to Malta and British India before seeing active service in the European theatre of the First World War, which left him severely wounded. 

He then took up a posting as assistant adjutant at the Royal Military College. After the war, his main sphere of activity was in East Africa, where he served as Private Secretary to the Governor of Uganda (1925–1927), Chairman of the Agricultural Production and Settlement Board for Kenya (1939–1945), Timber Controller for East Africa (1940–1945), Member of the Government of Kenya for Agriculture and Natural Resources (1945–1955), and Speaker of the Kenya Legislative Council (1955–1960). He was a Delegate to the Delhi Conference of 1940.

He became the heir presumptive of his third cousin, William Cavendish-Bentinck, 7th Duke of Portland, after the deaths of the latter's brother Lord (Francis) Morven Dallas Cavendish-Bentinck (1900-1950) and half-uncle Charles Cavendish-Bentinck (1868-1956). The previous duke's lands came to stay with the descendants of the 7th Duke and never passed to the distantly related 8th Duke in 1977.  

In the early 20th century the usual tail male arrangement of the entailed largest landholdings became deprecated by powerful statutes as it tended to leave noble daughters with little. The 6th Duke, before dying in 1943 broke the entails and set up a trust which saw as his son the future 7th Duke left no son Welbeck Abbey and other large holdings would go to his granddaughters in turn including Lady Anne Cavendish-Bentinck. 

No viable family court case could ensue as the fee tail was abolished as a recognised entity in the abstract (in law) under the Law of Property Act 1925 and any remote, entailed beneficiaries could be disinherited under the Settled Land Acts. The new Duke of Portland continued to live in Nairobi.

Elizabeth II shares an ancestor, in the 3rd Duke of Portland, through her maternal grandmother, Cecilia Cavendish-Bentinck, and is thus a third cousin, once removed, of the 8th Duke of Portland.

Family 
In 1912, he married Wentworth Frances (d 1964), daughter of William James Hope-Johnston. They divorced in 1950 without issue.

In 1950, he married Gwyneth Ethel (d 1986), daughter of John Lesley Edwards and widow of Colonel David A.J. Bowie. Again, this marriage produced no issue.

He was succeeded by his younger brother, Victor Cavendish-Bentinck, as the 9th Duke upon his death.

Arms

References

Portland, Ferdinand William Cavendish-Bentinck, 8th Duke of
Portland, Ferdinand William Cavendish-Bentinck, 8th Duke of
Portland, Ferdinand William Cavendish-Bentinck, 8th Duke of
Portland, Ferdinand William Cavendish-Bentinck, 8th Duke of
108
F
English people of Dutch descent
Graduates of the Royal Military College, Sandhurst
Knights Commander of the Order of the British Empire
Companions of the Order of St Michael and St George
British emigrants to Kenya
Members of the Legislative Council of Kenya